The 1993 World Artistic Gymnastics Championships were held in Birmingham,Great Britain. There was no team competition at this meet; gymnasts competed in the all-around and event finals only.

The opening ceremony took place on 12 April at the National Indoor Arena, and the competition took place from 13–18 April at the National Exhibition Centre. Fifty-seven nations participated, more than at any previous edition of the World Artistic Gymnastics Championships. The member states of the Soviet Union competed under their own flags for the first time.

This was the first world championships to allow only 24 gymnasts in the all-around final, with 2 gymnasts per nation instead of 3. This format returned at the 2003 World Championships and has remained ever since.

Medallists 
* Because Belenky's home country, Azerbaijan, did not have a gymnastics federation, he competed at this event as an independent (UNA) athlete.

Medals

Overall

Men

Women

Participants

Men 

* Because Belenky's home country, Azerbaijan, did not have a gymnastics federation, he competed at this meet as an unattached (UNA) athlete.

Women

Men's results

All-around

Floor exercise

Pommel horse

Rings

Vault

Parallel bars

Horizontal bar

Women's results

All-around

Vault

Uneven bars

Balance beam

Floor exercise 

World Artistic Gymnastics Championships
Artistic World 1993
G
1993 in gymnastics
1990s in Birmingham, West Midlands
Trampoline World Championships